The Newark Jewish Chronicle was a daily newspaper published in Newark, New Jersey, by Anton Kaufman from 1921 to January 8, 1943. By 1942 it was the last remaining Jewish newspaper in Newark, New Jersey.

History
The newspaper was established in 1921. During World War II advertising revenue fell and Kaufman was forced to sell his cemetery plot to keep the paper going. Anton Kaufman took his own life on January 1, 1943, and the last issue was on January 8, 1943.

References

Defunct newspapers published in New Jersey
1921 establishments in New Jersey
Newspapers established in 1921
Jews and Judaism in Newark, New Jersey
Publications disestablished in 1943
Jewish newspapers published in the United States
Mass media in Newark, New Jersey